Yelena Arshintseva  (born April 5, 1971) is a retired female race walker from Russia, who competed for her native country in the early 1990s.

International competitions

References

1971 births
Living people
Russian female racewalkers
World Athletics Championships athletes for Russia
Russian Athletics Championships winners
20th-century Russian women